Mario Ledesma Arocena (born 17 May 1973 in Buenos Aires) is an Argentine rugby union coach and a former international rugby player. He played in Argentina's successful 2007 Rugby World Cup campaign and had a professional playing career in France spanning 10 years. Since retiring he has coached at the highest level in the Northern and Southern Hemispheres and was most recently the head coach of the Argentine national team.

Family
Ledesma comes from a sporting family. His younger brother Pedro Ledesma, also an international player, played at Stade Français between 2006 and 2011.

Playing career

Early days
Ledesma started his senior career as a flanker playing for Curupaytí in Buenos Aires in 1990. It was there he converted to hooker where he gained many accolades and praised throughout his playing career. In 1992, he became an U19 Argentina international, and represented his Buenos Aires district in youth level before making the step up to senior level in 1994. He made his international debut against Uruguay in 1996 during the Pan American Championship. By 1997, he became a regular in the Pumas starting XV and even captained the side against Japan in September 1998. In 1999, he was selected for his first Rugby World Cup campaign, where he started in every game; including their 47–26 quarter-final defeat to France.

Professional in France

By 2001, Ledesma earned his first professional contract when he signed with Narbonne for two seasons. Ahead of the 2003 Rugby World Cup, where Argentina failed to advance past the group stage, Ledesma signed with Castres Olympique. It was with Castres where Ledesma gained his first experience at the top level in Europe, the Heineken Cup. By 2005, he earned over 35 caps for Argentina and 80 professional appearances at French club level, and later signed with Clermont Auvergne ahead of the newly formed Top14 competition.

On 12 November 2005, Ledesma earned his 50th test cap during Argentina's 23–19 victory over Scotland. This was followed by a 39–22 victory over Italy the following week to earn a clean sweep on their 2005 end-of-year tour campaign.

The 2006/07 season proved successful for Ledesma. Not only did he help his country earn their first win over England since 1997, but he helped his club claim the 2006–07 European Challenge Cup title, their first taste of European silver since 1999. Clermont also made their first appearance in a French final since 2001, only to lose to Stade Français 23–18, after a 78th minute try by Radike Samo. That same year, Argentina made it to the semi-finals of the 2007 Rugby World Cup, after topping their pool with victories over hosts France (17–12) and Ireland (30–15). In the quarter-finals, Argentina defeated Scotland 19–13 to make their first ever semi-final, only to lose to South Africa, 37–13. However, they defeated France, 34–10, again in the Bronze final, to finish third and reach their highest World Rugby Ranking.

The next three years saw Clermont make three consecutive finals; losing to Toulouse 26–20 in 2008 and Perpignan 22–13 in 2009. By 2010, Clermont finally claimed the title, defeating the holders Perpignan 19–6. Ledesma also helped his side advance to the knock-out stage of the 2009–10 Heineken Cup, although lose to Leinster 29–28 in the quarter-final.

Retirement
By 2011, Ledesma announced he would retire at the end of the season, and his last professional club game was a 29–6 loss to in the semi-final of the 2010–11 Top 14 season. However, his career hadn't ended yet, for he was selected for his fourth World Cup campaign in 2011. Ledesma was one of the leaders of Los Pumas' pack, and helped his side finish the pool stage 2nd, losing only to England. In the quarter-final, saw Argentina face hosts New Zealand, who won the game 33–10. When Ledesma came off at the 70th minute, it was his final appearance for his nation. During the World Cup, The Daily Telegraph considered Ledesma as one of the best in his position at the 2011 World Cup.

Coaching career

Coaching in France
Following the Rugby World Cup in New Zealand and Ledesma's retirement, Ledesma returned to France to begin his coaching career. He joined Stade Français as forwards coach under Michael Cheika, where he helped improve the teams positioning to seventh in the Top 14 and guided them to top seed in the 2011–12 European Challenge Cup. However, they were knocked out by Toulon in the semi-finals, losing 32–29.

In June 2012, Ledesma joined the Montpellier coaching set-up under the leadership of Fabien Galthié. In his first season at the club, Montpellier maintained their position from the following year, bowing out in the quarter-finals to Castres 25–12. Whilst in Europe, they were eliminated by Clermont 36–14 at the same stage. However, the 2013–14 Top 14 season saw Montpellier finish second on the table at the end of the regular season, and bypassed the quarter-finals to meet Castres in the semi-finals. However, like before, Castres finished on top, 22–19. The 2014/15 season started promising for Montpellier, winning six out of their opening nine games. However, back to back defeats in the European Rugby Champions Cup, started a slump at the club, losing a further three games at Top14 level. In mid-November, Ledesma resigned from his position at Montpellier after a poor run of form. The then head coach, Galthié soon followed a month later.

Australia
In January 2015, Ledesma rejoined his former coach Michael Cheika, and joined the New South Wales Waratahs Super Rugby franchise ahead of the 2015 season. He joined the side as a set-piece consultant, and by March 2015, just a month into the season, the Waratahs scrum made great strides. By round 15, the Waratahs were sitting comfortably in top place in the Australian conference, and with their win in round 18, their place was confirmed in the semi-finals, bypassing the quarter-finals. However, the Waratahs lost to eventual Champions the Highlanders 37–15.

In July 2015, Ledesma followed Cheika to the Wallabies, after being appointed as forwards coach ahead of the 2015 Rugby World Cup. He helped make the Wallabies scrum a strength rather than the weakness it was perceived as. It was the scrum that helped the Wallabies claim the 2015 Rugby Championship title and top their pool in the World Cup, with victories over England and Wales. With wins over Scotland and Argentina in the quarter and semi-finals, the Wallabies made their first World Cup final since 2003, where they faced the All Blacks; who won the game 34–17.

Ledesma remained with the Wallabies as forwards coach until the end of the 2017 season, after he was appointed head coach of the Jaguares in October 2017.

Jaguares
It would be Ledesma's first stint as head coach, after six years of assisting at the highest level. His first competitive match in charge was a 28–20 defeat to the Stormers, which were followed by two further defeats. However, in round 4, Ledesma gained his first competitive victory, knocking over his former side, the Waratahs, 38–28. Between round 8 and round 17, Ledesma led his side to seven consecutive wins (between two byes), the longest winning streak the team has ever had. It was that streak that helped the Jaguares to earn a place in the quarter-finals for the first time, although were knocked out by the Lions after losing 40–23.

Argentina national coach
After Daniel Hourcade resigned as Pumas head coach in June 2018, it was speculated that the new head coach would be either Ledesma or Gonzalo Quesada. However, on 1 August, it was officially announced that Ledesma would replace Hourcade as Pumas head coach, with the latter being announced as Ledesma's replacement at the Jaguares on 8 August. Ledesma signed a three-year deal with the UAR, which would see him make six consecutive appearances at a World Cup across playing and coaching during the 2019 Rugby World Cup. Ahead of the 2018 Rugby Championship, Ledesma named 14 uncapped players in his squad, and during the Championship itself, brought back an overseas player from France. Ledesma's first match in charge was a 34–21 defeat to South Africa, before winning the return fixture a week later 32–19. In Round 4, Argentina defeated the Wallabies in Australia 23–19, to see Argentina win in Australia for the first time since 1983. Argentina could have finished third place at the end of the Championship after leading Australia in the final round 31–7 at half time. But Australia scored 38 unanswered points in the second half to win after a record comeback 45–34. The 2018 November test window saw Argentina lose all three of their games; losing to Ireland, France and Scotland.

The 2019 Rugby Championship showed promise for the Pumas, narrowly losing to New Zealand in the opening round of the 2019 Rugby Championship. Despite this, Argentina went onto lose all three games of the Championship finishing bottom of the table.

Ledesma coached the Pumas to their first ever win over the All Blacks during the 2020 Tri Nations Series.

After a winless campaign during the 2021 Rugby Championship, there have been numerous calls for his resignation, and on 9 February 2022, it was announced that he had left his post as head coach.

International matches as head coach

Record by country

Honours

Playing

Argentina
Rugby World Cup / Webb Ellis Cup
Third: 2007
South American Rugby Championship
Winners: 1997, 1998
Pan American Championship
Winners: 1996

Clermont Auvergne
European Challenge Cup
Winners: 2007
Top 14
Winners: 2010
Runners-up: 2007, 2008, 2009

Coaching

Australia (as assistant coach)
Rugby World Cup / Webb Ellis Cup
Runners-up: 2015
Rugby Championship
Winners: 2015
Runners-up: 2016, 2017
Mandela Challenge Plate
Winners: 2015, 2016, 2017
Puma Trophy
Winners: 2015, 2016, 2017
Trophée des Bicentenaires
Winners: 2016
Hopetoun Cup
Winners: 2016

Argentina ''
Rugby Championship
Runners-up: 2020

References

External links
 Mario Ledesma at Unión Argentina de Rugby 
 Mario Ledesma on ercrugby.com
 1999 RWC profile

Argentina national rugby union team coaches
Argentine rugby union coaches
Argentine rugby union players
1973 births
Rugby union players from Buenos Aires
Living people
Rugby union hookers
ASM Clermont Auvergne players
Argentina international rugby union players